The  is an association football stadium in Kanagawa-ku, Yokohama, Japan. It serves as a home ground of Yokohama FC and, on occasion, Yokohama F. Marinos. Until 1999 it had been the home of Yokohama FC's spiritual predecessor, Yokohama Flügels, and also, on occasion, to Kawasaki-based NKK FC. The stadium holds 15,454 people.

It was formerly known as Yokohama Mitsuzawa Football Stadium. Since March 2008 it has been called NHK Spring Mitsuzawa Football Stadium for the naming rights by NHK Spring Company.

It is also used sometimes for Top League rugby games.

During the 1964 Summer Olympics in Tokyo, it hosted some of the football preliminaries.  It was also one of the venues of the 1979 FIFA World Youth Championship.

References

1964 Summer Olympics official report. Volume 1. Part 1. pp. 133–4.
J. League stadium guide 

1955 establishments in Japan
Sports venues completed in 1955
Sports venues in Yokohama
Football venues in Japan
Rugby union stadiums in Japan
Rugby in Kantō
Yokohama F. Marinos
Yokohama Flügels
Yokohama FC
YSCC Yokohama
Venues of the 1964 Summer Olympics
Olympic football venues